Precis cuama, the paler commodore, is a butterfly in the family Nymphalidae. It is found in the Democratic Republic of the Congo (Shaba), eastern and central Tanzania, Malawi, Zambia, Mozambique and Zimbabwe. The habitat consists of savanna and open woodland, especially in rocky areas.

Adults are on wing from December to July.

References

Butterflies described in 1864
Junoniini
Butterflies of Africa
Taxa named by William Chapman Hewitson